The 2014 Icelandic Cup, also known as Borgunarbikar for sponsorship reasons, was the 55th edition of the Icelandic national football cup.

First round

Second round

Third round

Fourth round

Quarterfinal

Semifinal

Final

References

External links
Official site 

2014 in Icelandic football
2014 domestic association football cups
Icelandic Men's Football Cup